Aref al-Aref (1892–1973), variously spelled as Arif el Arif, 'Arif el-'Arif, etc., was a Palestinian journalist, historian and politician. He served as mayor of East Jerusalem in the 1950s during the  Jordanian annexation of the West Bank.

Biography
Aref al-Aref was born in 1892 as Aref Shehadeh in Jerusalem in 1892. His father was a vegetable vendor. Excelling at his studies in primary school, he was sent to high school in the Ottoman Empire. He attended the Marjan Preparatory School and Mulkiyya College in Istanbul. During his college studies, he wrote for a Turkish newspaper. Later, he worked as a translator for the Ministry of Foreign Affairs. He served as an officer in the Ottoman Army in World War I. He was captured on the Caucasus front and spent three years in a prisoner of war camp in Krasnoyarsk, Siberia. In Krasnoyarsk, he edited a newspaper in handwritten Arabic called Nakatullah [Camel of God] and translated Ernst Haeckel's Die Weltraethsel ("The Riddles of the Universe") into Turkish. After the Russian Revolution he escaped and returned to Ottoman Palestine.

Aref al-Aref died on 30 July 1973, in al-Bireh.

Political activism

By 1919, al-Aref was involved in political activism in Palestine, agitating for unity of Palestine with Syria. In October 1919, he became editor of the recently established newspaper Suriya al-Janubiya (Southern Syria), which was the first Arab nationalist newspaper published in Jerusalem and was an organ of the al-Nadi al-'Arabi (The Arab Club). Initially the paper supported the British military authorities, but soon became an opponent of the British Mandate.

Al-Aref attended the Nebi Musa religious festival in Jerusalem in 1920 riding on his horse, and gave a speech at the Jaffa Gate. The nature of his speech is disputed. According to Benny Morris, he said "If we don't use force against the Zionists and against the Jews, we will never be rid of them", while Bernard Wasserstein wrote "he seems to have cooperated with the police, and there is no evidence that he actively instigated violence". In fact, "Zionist intelligence reports of this period are unanimous in stressing that he spoke repeatedly against violence". Soon the festival became a riot involving attacks on the local Jews. Al-Aref was arrested for incitement, but when he was let out on bail he escaped to Syria together with co-accused Haj Amin al-Husseini. In another version, he was warned and escaped before being arrested. He advised Arabs against violence, urging them instead to adopt the "discipline, silence, and courage" of their opponents. In his absence, a military court sentenced him to 10 years imprisonment.

In Damascus, al-Aref became a deputy to the General Syrian Congress and with Hajj Amin and others formed al-Jam'iyya al-'Arabiyya al-Filastiniyya (Palestinian Arab Society). He became its Secretary-General and campaigned against the decisions of the San Remo conference. After the French invasion of Syria in July 1920, he fled to Transjordan. He returned to Jerusalem late in 1920 after being pardoned by the new British High Commissioner of Palestine, Herbert Samuel, but the government refused to allow his newspaper to reopen.

Political career
In 1921, he was appointed as a district Officer of the British administration by the Civil Secretary, Colonel Wyndham Deedes. He served in that capacity in Jenin, Nablus, Beisan, and Jaffa.  In 1926 he was seconded to the Government of Transjordan as Chief Secretary, where he served for three years. However he continued his political activities on the side to the displeasure of his British superior. He returned to Palestine in 1929, where he served as District Officer in Beersheba and later in Gaza.  In 1933 he received a special commendation from the High Commissioner for keeping his district quiet during a time of disturbances elsewhere. In 1942 he was promoted and transferred to al-Bireh. He continued as a Mandate official until 1948.

Upon Jordanian control of the West Bank, al-Aref was first appointed military governor of Ramallah governorate, and then, from 1949 to 1955, served as mayor of East Jerusalem. In 1967, he was appointed director of the Palestine Archaeological Museum (Rockefeller Museum) in Jerusalem.

Published works 
All following books have been published in Arabic, unless mentioned otherwise, and the English titles are literal translations of the Arabic ones.
[The] Bedouin Law/Bedouin Judiciary (Al Qadaa bayn al Badou), 1933; new edition published in Beirut, 2001
History of Beersheba and its Tribes (Tarikh B’ir al-Sabi‘ wa Qabailiha), Jerusalem 1934. Probably identical with "The Bedouin Love, Law and Legend: History of Beersheba and Its Tribes", 1934
My Vision (Ru'yay), Jerusalem 1943
History of Gaza (Tarikh Ghazza), Jerusalem 1943
Gazan-Jerusalemite History (Tarigh Ghaza-Al Quds), Jerusalem 1943
'Aref el-'Aref, in collaboration with/editor Harold W. Tilley, in English. Bedouin Love, Law and Legend, Dealing Exclusively with the Badu of Beersheba. Jerusalem 1944. Also listed as Bedouin Love, Law and Legend: History of Beersheba and Its Tribes.
History of al-Haram al-Sharif (Tarikh al-Haram al-Sharif or Tarikh al-Haram al-Qudsi), Jerusalem 1947
History of Jerusalem (Tarikh al-Quds), Cairo 1951 and/or Summary of the History of Jerusalem (Al Mijaz fi Tarikh al Quds), Cairo 1951
The Disaster (al-Nakba), six vols., 1956–1961.  Also listed as The catastrophe: The catastrophe of Jerusalem and the lost paradise (al-Nakba: Nakbat Bayt al-Maqdis wal-firdaws al-mafqud)
The Detailed History of Jerusalem (al-Mufassal fi Tarikh al-Quds), Jerusalem 1961

References

Bibliography

, quoting the official history of the Haganah

 Very limited access to the text on Google Books.

Arab people in Mandatory Palestine
20th-century Palestinian historians
1890s births
1973 deaths
Mayors of Jerusalem
Arabs in Ottoman Palestine
World War I prisoners of war held by Russia
Ottoman prisoners of war
Ottoman Army officers
Ottoman military personnel of World War I
Chief Secretaries of Transjordan
Palestine ethnographers